Heermance House and Law Office is a historic home located at Rhinecliff, Dutchess County, New York. Located on the property is a cottage, built about 1858 in the Picturesque Italianate style; the Gothic-inspired law office building, built about 1886; and a garage, built about 1900.  The house is a two-story, three bay building with a broad picturesque verandah, ornamental brackets, and pierced woodwork.  It has a long, two story, gable roofed rear wing.  The law office building is a small, one story frame structure sheathed in clapboard.

It was added to the National Register of Historic Places in 1987.

See also

 Acker and Evans Law Office: NRHP listing in Ogdensburg, New York
 Clinton–Rosekrans Law Building: NRHP listing in Greene (Village), New York
 National Register of Historic Places listings in Rhinebeck, New York

References

Houses on the National Register of Historic Places in New York (state)
Italianate architecture in New York (state)
Houses completed in 1858
Houses in Rhinebeck, New York
National Register of Historic Places in Dutchess County, New York
Law offices
Legal history of New York (state)